New Bedford Whaling National Historical Park (NBWNHP) is a United States National Historical Park in New Bedford, Massachusetts, and is maintained by the National Park Service (NPS). The park commemorates the heritage of the world's preeminent whaling port during the nineteenth century.

Established in 1996, the park encompasses 34 acres (fourteen hectares) dispersed over thirteen city blocks. It includes a visitor center, the New Bedford National Historic Landmark District, the New Bedford Whaling Museum, the Seamen's Bethel, the schooner Ernestina, and the Rotch–Jones–Duff House and Garden Museum.

As a National Park, the NBWNHP is rather unusual in that the only properties owned by the NPS are the Visitor Center and the Corson Maritime Learning Center. Rather, the park is a historic district administered under a partnership between the NPS, the City of New Bedford and private building owners to preserve the historic landscapes, structures, and collections and promote research and educational programming associated with the history of whaling. The enabling legislation also established a formal affiliation with the Iñupiat Heritage Center in Utqiaġvik, Alaska, to commemorate the more than 2,000 whaling voyages from New Bedford to the Western Arctic. The city promotes visitation to the park through advertising that calls it "New England's real seaport", as opposed to Connecticut's Mystic Seaport Museum which is a collection of historic buildings and vessels moved from various other locations throughout the region.

Although the famed Whaleman Memorial (commonly called the "Whaleman's Statue") is not within the park's boundaries, it is located only two blocks beyond its western boundary at the corner of William and Pleasant Streets in front of the New Bedford Public Library.

See also
Merrill's Wharf Historic District
New Bedford Whaling Museum
National Register of Historic Places listings in New Bedford, Massachusetts

External links

National Park Service: New Bedford Whaling National Historical Park
New Bedford Whaling Museum
The Schooner Ernestina

 
New Bedford, Massachusetts
Protected areas established in 1996
National Historical Parks in Massachusetts
Parks in Bristol County, Massachusetts
1996 establishments in Massachusetts
National Register of Historic Places in New Bedford, Massachusetts
National Historical Parks of the United States
Parks on the National Register of Historic Places in Massachusetts